Lyle, Lyle, Crocodile is a 2022 American musical comedy film directed by Will Speck and Josh Gordon from a screenplay by William Davies. Produced by Columbia Pictures in association with Eagle Pictures and TSG Entertainment II, and distributed by Sony Pictures Releasing, it is an adaptation of the children's story of the same name and its predecessor The House on East 88th Street by Bernard Waber. The plot focuses on a family who moves to New York City, where their struggling son befriends a singing crocodile and tries to protect him from the rest of the world. The film stars Shawn Mendes as the voice of the titular character, alongside Javier Bardem, Constance Wu, Winslow Fegley, Scoot McNairy, Brett Gelman, and Ego Nwodim.

Lyle, Lyle, Crocodile released in the United States on October 7, 2022 by Columbia Pictures. The film received generally positive reviews from critics with praise for the visuals, Bardem's acting, and Mendes' singing performance as Lyle, and has grossed $107 million worldwide against a $50 million budget.

Plot
In New York City, a charismatic magician named Hector P. Valenti wants to try out on a national talent show but is constantly rejected. One day after a failed audition, he wanders into an exotic pet store, where he finds a singing baby crocodile and names him Lyle. Seeing Lyle as an opportunity to become rich in the talent business, he places his three-story Victorian brownstone house as collateral for their performance, but Lyle experiences stage fright during the premiere and Hector loses the house. Hector is forced to move out and reluctantly leaves Lyle to fend for himself while he tries to make more money.

Eighteen months later, Tom and Wendy Primm and their young son Josh move into the house. Josh is initially terrified of moving into his new home and struggles to make friends at school. One night, he discovers Lyle, now fully grown, living in the attic, and they become friends when Lyle saves Josh from a mugger and demonstrates his singing talent. Wendy and Tom eventually find out about Lyle, and though initially terrified of him, bond with Lyle over their favorite hobbies. One day, Hector returns to the house to visit Lyle, as an agreement states he can live in the house fifteen days a year. He makes another attempt to get Lyle to perform on stage, but it fails as Lyle still has stage fright, apart from when performing for the Primms.

Meanwhile, Alistair Grumps, the Primms' unfriendly downstairs neighbor, becomes annoyed by the loud activity caused by Lyle, Hector, and the Primms. Determined to put an end to it, he has cameras installed to discover what is happening but manages to achieve his goal by bribing Hector to sell out Lyle in exchange for money to pay his debts. Lyle cannot convince the authorities of his benevolent nature because of his stage fright and is locked up at the zoo. Feeling guilty for what he did to Lyle, Hector goes to break him out of the zoo with Josh's help, who was initially unwilling to help after learning Hector sold Lyle out. On Josh's insistence, Hector and Lyle reconcile with each other before Lyle escapes with Josh to the talent show, while Hector distracts the authorities. On stage, Lyle manages to overcome his stage fright with help from Josh, receiving acclaim from the audience and viewers for his singing talent.

One month later, a trial is held to determine whether or not Lyle may be free. The judge ultimately decides to rule over Grumps in favor of Lyle when Hector reveals that the deed to his house was written out to his grandmother, that was hidden away under Grumps' bed, who built the house and founded the New York City Zoo where Lyle was previously kept, allowing her to keep exotic animals as pets. After the trial, the Primms celebrate Lyle's freedom, and Grumps' implied eviction, by taking him on vacation, while Hector becomes acquainted with a new talented animal: a beatboxing rattlesnake named Malfoy, owned by Josh's friend, Trudy.

Cast
 Javier Bardem as Hector P. Valenti, Lyle's charismatic owner
 Constance Wu as Wendy Primm, Josh's stepmother and Tom's wife who is a cookbook author
 Winslow Fegley as Josh Primm, Tom and Wendy's son and Lyle's best friend
 Scoot McNairy as Tom Primm, Josh's father and Wendy's husband who is a math teacher
 Brett Gelman as Alistair Grumps, the Primms' unfriendly downstairs neighbor who has a grudge against Lyle 
 Ego Nwodim as Carol, an employee of the school where Mr. Primm works
 Shawn Mendes as the voice of Lyle, an anthropomorphic saltwater crocodile who cannot talk but can sing
 Ben Palacios as Lyle's motion capture
 Lyric Hurd as Trudy, Josh's friend from school and love interest who owns a beatboxing rattlesnake named Malfoy

Production
Lyle, Lyle, Crocodile is a feature film adaptation of both the children's story of the same name and its prequel The House on East 88th Street, both of which were written by Bernard Waber. Both books were previously adapted as a 1987 animated HBO special titled Lyle, Lyle Crocodile: The Musical – The House on East 88th Street, which was also a musical. It was announced in May 2021 with filmmaking duo Will Speck and Josh Gordon attached to direct from a screenplay by William Davies for Sony Pictures. Filming took place in New York City in September 2021. Notable filming locations include 85th Street, 86th Street, Astor Place and Bowery station, and Broadway, between 45th Street and 46th Street. Visual effects were handled by Framestore, OPSIS, and Day for Nite.

Music

Original songs for the film were written by its executive producers Benj Pasek and Justin Paul along with Ari Afsar, Emily Gardner Xu Hall, Mark Sonnenblick, and Joriah Kwamé while Matthew Margeson composed the original score. Due to the COVID-19 pandemic, the songwriters collaborated remotely using Google Docs and Zoom. Shawn Mendes, who voices the titular crocodile, features on eight of the soundtrack album's tracks, which also contains songs by Elton John and Stevie Wonder. "Heartbeat" was released as the soundtrack's first single on September 23, 2022, and the soundtrack was released by Island Records on September 30. The score album was released by Madison Gate Records on October 7.

Release
The film was released in theaters in the United States by Sony Pictures Releasing on October 7, 2022. It was originally going to be released on July 22, 2022, but in September 2021, the film was postponed to November 18, 2022. In April 2022, the film was brought forward to its October 7 date, taking over the release date of Spider-Man: Across the Spider-Verse.

The film was released on VOD on November 22, 2022, and on Blu-ray, DVD, and 4K UHD on December 13, 2022.

The film was released on Netflix in the United States on February 4, 2023 where it will stream for 18 months due to a “pay 1 window” deal with Netflix and Sony and a “pay 2 window” deal with Sony and Disney+ shortly after.

Reception

Box office 
Lyle, Lyle, Crocodile grossed $46.9 million in the United States and Canada, and $60.8 million in other territories, for a worldwide total of $107.7 million against a production budget of $50 million.

In the United States and Canada, Lyle, Lyle, Crocodile was released alongside Amsterdam, and was projected to gross $11–12 million from 4,350 theaters in its opening weekend. The film made $3.5 million on its first day, including $575,000 from Thursday night previews. It went on to debut to $11.5 million, finishing second behind holdover Smile. The film made $7.4 million in its second weekend, dropping 35% and finishing in third. Lyle, Lyle, Crocodile then made $4.3 million in its third weekend, declining 42% and finished in fifth place.

Critical response 

  Audiences polled by CinemaScore gave the film an average grade of "A-" on an A+ to F scale, while those at PostTrak gave it an 80% overall positive score, with 62% saying they would definitely recommend it.

Cath Clarke of The Guardian gave the film a mixed review giving it 3 out of 5 stars and wrote: "Javier Bardem marches away with the film as flamboyant failed showman Hector P Valenti. Next to his dazzle, everything else about Lyle, Lyle Crocodile, adapted from Bernard Waber’s much-loved picture books, looks a bit average."

Ryan Leston for IGN called the film "charming", praising the character of Hector writing: “Sure, it’s not exactly original, essentially a mish-mash of similar films including Hop and Sing, and most of the laughs feel familiar. But Lyle, Lyle, Crocodile conjures up enough of the old showbiz charm to win you over. It’s heart-warming, too – Lyle may be the singer, but he helps those around him find their voice, and sometimes that’s exactly what we need: a singing crocodile to just be a good pal.”

Robert Abele was less than positive with his review writing for The Wrap: “Did Lyle, Lyle, Crocodile look good in storyboards or sound fun in creative meetings? Because it’s a certifiable mess on its webbed hind feet, teetering uncomfortably as both fanciful family comedy and live-action/animated musical, whether trying to make dumpster diving look whimsical (it isn’t) or the tunes sound like anything but positivity-anthem-generator readouts."

Nell Minow, writing for RogerEbert.com, was more positive in her review of the film, giving it a score of 3 out of 4 stars. She wrote: "Lyle, Lyle, Crocodile is a bit too long for a family movie, with some unnecessary complications toward the end, and it's not quite up to the Paddington level of movie adaptations of classic children's books. But it is a warm-hearted family film with great musical numbers that will make another generation of kids hopefully search the attic on the chance that they might find a singing crocodile."

Awards 
Lyle, Lyle, Crocodile was nominated for Best Family Movie at the Movieguide Awards.

References

External links
 
 
 

2022 comedy films
2022 computer-animated films
2022 fantasy films
2020s American animated films
2020s English-language films
2020s fantasy comedy films
2020s musical comedy films
American animated comedy films
American animated fantasy films
American fantasy comedy films
American films with live action and animation
American musical comedy films
American musical fantasy films
Animated films about crocodilians
Columbia Pictures animated films
Columbia Pictures films
Animated films about families
Films based on children's books
Films directed by Will Speck and Josh Gordon
Films impacted by the COVID-19 pandemic
Films scored by Matthew Margeson
Films set in New York City
Films shot in New York City
Films with screenplays by William Davies
Musicals by Pasek and Paul
TSG Entertainment films
Films about crocodilians